Mauri Nyberg-Noroma (31 January 1908 in Vyborg – 23 December 1939 in Muolaa) was a Finnish gymnast.

He won three Olympic medals for Finland. He took part in his first Olympics in 1928 in Amsterdam but did not medal. He came joint sixth after a fifth place in the rings and seventh on the pommel horse and parallel bars. The Finnish team came in fifth place in the team competition.

In the next Olympics, in 1932, Finland took bronze in the team competition. Individually, Nyberg-Noroma failed to medal, but he came in fourth place in the parallel bars, 1.4 points behind his compatriot Heikki Savolainen, who took bronze. Overall, he came in ninth place.

At the Olympics in Berlin in 1936, the Finns repeated their result from the previous Olympics and won bronze in the team competition. This time, Nyberg-Noroma came in 16th place overall. He was killed in action during the Winter War.

References

External links

1908 births
1939 deaths
Sportspeople from Vyborg
People from Viipuri Province (Grand Duchy of Finland)
Finnish male artistic gymnasts
Olympic gymnasts of Finland
Gymnasts at the 1928 Summer Olympics
Gymnasts at the 1932 Summer Olympics
Gymnasts at the 1936 Summer Olympics
Olympic medalists in gymnastics
Olympic bronze medalists for Finland
Finnish military personnel killed in World War II
Medalists at the 1936 Summer Olympics
Medalists at the 1932 Summer Olympics
20th-century Finnish people